The 2011 Copa Caixa Stock Car season was the 33rd Stock Car Brasil season. It began on March 20 at the Curitiba and ended on November 6 at the Velopark, after twelve rounds. For this season, the Manufacturer Peugeot announced that the 408 was to be the new representative in the championship replacing the 307.

Cacá Bueno won the Drivers' Championship by thirteen points from Ricardo Mauricio, with his brother Popó Bueno finishing in third eighteen behind Cacá.

Teams and drivers
All drivers were Brazilian-registered, excepting Jacques Villeneuve, who raced under Canadian racing license.

Race calendar and results
All races were held in Brazil.

Championship standings
Points were awarded as follows:

Drivers' Championship

Teams' Championship

References

External links
 Official website of the Stock Car Brasil (in Portuguese)

Stock Car Brasil seasons
Stock Car Brasil season